Mitch Buonaguro (born December 4, 1953) is an American college basketball coach and current consultant at Saint Rose.

Coaching career
Buonaguro was an assistant coach under Rollie Massimino for the national champion 1984–85 Villanova Wildcats men's basketball team.

Buonaguro was the head coach at Fairfield University from 1985 to 1991. During his first season, he coached the Stags to its first MAAC Championship, first berth in NCAA tournament where the Stags faced the Illinois Fighting Illini in the first round; and ended the year with a 24–7 record, the most wins in school history. As a result, his MAAC coaching peers recognized him as the 1985–86 MAAC Coach of the Year. The following season, Buonaguro coached Fairfield through an injury-plagued season to mount an improbable run to its second consecutive MAAC Championship and to earn its second consecutive bid to the NCAA tournament where the Stags faced the top-seeded and eventual national champion Indiana Hoosiers in the first round.

Buonaguro was named the 15th head coach in Siena history on April 8, 2010, after being the lead assistant coach at Siena the past five years for previous coach Fran McCaffery. After posting a 35–59 record in three seasons Buonaguro was dismissed from Siena on March 12, 2013.

In April 2015, Buonaguro re-joined Fairfield as an assistant. Buonaguro was led go from Fairfield in 2019 after head coach Sydney Johnson was fired. Buonaguro became a special consultant for Saint Rose's men's and women's basketball teams.

Head coaching record

References

External links
 Siena profile

1953 births
Living people
American men's basketball coaches
American men's basketball players
Basketball coaches from New York (state)
Basketball players from New York City
Boston College Eagles men's basketball coaches
Boston College Eagles men's basketball players
Cleveland State Vikings men's basketball coaches
College men's basketball head coaches in the United States
Fairfield Stags men's basketball coaches
Saint Rose Golden Knights men's basketball coaches
Siena Saints men's basketball coaches
Sportspeople from Queens, New York
Texas A&M Aggies men's basketball coaches
UNC Greensboro Spartans men's basketball coaches
Villanova Wildcats men's basketball coaches